The Harpellaceae are a family of fungi in the Harpellales order. The family contains 5 genera and 40 species.

References

External links

Zygomycota